Adanwomasi Senior High School is a coeducational second-cycle institution at Adanwomasi in the Kwabre East District of Ashanti.

History 
It was established as a private institution in 1972. The school started with a student population of 32 with 6 teachers and 19 non-teaching staff. The school was absorbed into the public system in 1977.

References 

Ashanti Region
High schools in Ghana
Public schools in Ghana
Educational institutions established in 1972
1972 establishments in Ghana